John Arden Brown Maddison (12 February 1900 – 19 August 1987) was an English footballer who played at half-back for Stoke, Port Vale, Oldham Athletic, Gresley Rovers and Sutton Town.

Career
Maddison played for Usworth Colliery, before joining Stoke in 1923. His one appearance for Stoke came in a 0–0 draw with Stockport County at the Victoria Ground on 2 February 1924. He was released at the end of the 1923–24 season and joined local Second Division rivals Port Vale in October 1924. He played just eight games in the 1924–25 season, before making 30 appearances in the 1925–26 campaign. He scored his first senior goal on 9 October 1926, in a 2–1 defeat to Notts County at Meadow Lane. However, he fractured a collarbone in November 1926 and missed the rest of the 1926–27 season. He was released from his contract at The Old Recreation Ground in May 1927, and moved on to Oldham Athletic, Gresley Rovers and Sutton Town.

Career statistics
Source:

References

People from Washington, Tyne and Wear
Footballers from Tyne and Wear
English footballers
Association football defenders
Stoke City F.C. players
Port Vale F.C. players
Oldham Athletic A.F.C. players
Burton Town F.C. players
Prescot Cables F.C. players
Mansfield Town F.C. players
Nîmes Olympique players
Gresley F.C. players
Sutton Town A.F.C. players
English Football League players
Ligue 1 players
1900 births
1987 deaths